Buran may refer to:

Places
 Buran, Ardabil, a village in Ardabil Province, Iran
 Buran, Mazandaran, a village in Mazandaran Province, Iran
 Buraan, a town in the northern Sanaag region of Somalia
 Enhelsove, an urban-type settlement in Luhansk Oblast, Ukraine, renamed by Ukrainian authorities to Buran.

Other uses
 Buran (spacecraft), the Soviet counterpart of the space shuttle
 Buran programme, the Soviet space shuttle project
 Buran (wind), a wind that blows across eastern Asia
 Boran, queen of Iran from 629 to 632
 Buran bint al-Hasan ibn Sahl, consort of Abbasid caliph al-Ma'mun
 RSS-40 Buran, a Soviet cruise missile
 Buran eavesdropping device

See also
 Burang (disambiguation)
 Burren (disambiguation)
 Buranji, Indian historical chronicles
 Tripura Buranji